Märjamaa Parish is an Estonian municipality located in Rapla County. It had a population of 7,015 (as of November 2012) and an area of 1,164 km2 (336.54 mi2). Märjamaa Parish was the biggest municipality in Estonia by area.

In 2017 it was merged with Vigala Parish and three villages from Raikküla Parish to form a new parish (also named Märjamaa Parish).

Settlements
Borough
Märjamaa
Villages
Alaküla - Altküla - Aravere - Aruküla - Haimre - Hiietse - Inda - Jaaniveski - Jõeääre - Käbiküla - Kaguvere - Kangru - Käriselja - Kasti - Keskküla - Kiilaspere - Kilgi - Kirna - Kohatu - Kohtru - Koluta - Konuvere - Kõrtsuotsa - Kõrvetaguse - Kunsu - Laukna - Leevre - Lestima - Lokuta - Loodna - Luiste - Lümandu - Maidla - Mäliste - Männiku - Metsaääre - Metsküla - Mõisamaa - Moka - Mõraste - Nääri - Naistevalla - Napanurga - Nõmmeotsa - Nurme - Nurtu-Nõlva - Ohukotsu - Ojaäärse - Orgita - Päädeva - Paaduotsa - Paeküla - Paisumaa - Pajaka - Põlli - Pühatu - Purga - Rangu - Rassiotsa - Riidaku - Ringuta - Risu-Suurküla - Russalu - Sipa - Sõmeru - Sooniste - Soosalu - Sõtke - Sulu - Suurküla - Teenuse - Tolli - Ülejõe - Urevere - Vaimõisa - Valgu - Valgu-Vanamõisa - Vana-Nurtu - Varbola - Velise - Velisemõisa - Velise-Nõlva - Veski - Vilta - Võeva

Religion

People
Estonian Army General Jaan Kruus (1884–1942) was born in Sooniste Parish (now part of Märjamaa Parish).

Russian WWI general Paul von Rennenkampf was born in the village of Konuvere (now part of Märjamaa Parish).

External links

References